The Alstom Coradia is a family of diesel and electric multiple units for intercity and regional service manufactured by Alstom, with variants operating in Europe, North America, and Africa.

Design
The Coradia is a family of high-performance rolling stock, manufactured by Alstom Transport and offered in various configurations to suit the varying requirements of operators. It is available in both diesel multiple unit (DMU) and an electric multiple unit (EMU) configurations; a high-density double-decker model, the Coradia Duplex, has also been developed. The Coradia uses Alstom's own Onix IGBT traction system, which is promoted as providing smooth acceleration and energy conservation facilities. The standard variants of the train are fitted with a regenerative braking system. The Coradia can also be equipped with a variety of communication and signally systems, including national automatic train protection (ATP) and European Train Control System (ETCS).

The Coradia is designed to offer a high degree of comfort for passengers. The design of the interior incorporates a modular philosophy; as standard, the passenger compartment features ambient lighting, luggage racks and storage areas, as well as partition walls located between the foyer and the seating areas. Each seat can be equipped with electrical sockets, individual lighting, and various audio and video systems; both the pitch and configuration of the seats are customisable to meet the operator’s requirements. The internal fittings can be easily redistributed, being typically mounted onto purpose-built slots. Amongst the options available for customisation are equipment such as vending machines, in-train ticketing dispensers, and built-in internet provision; specialised accessibility facilities for disabled passengers can also be installed.

The Coradia range of regional trains includes the Coradia Duplex, Coradia Lint, Coradia Continental, Coradia Polyvalent and Coradia Nordic variants. Alstom has also developed the Coradia Meridian, specifically for Trenitalia and other regional operators in Italy. The Coradia Continental is an EMU operated as either three, four, five or six-carriage sets; up to four train-sets can be joined during peak times. The traction system is roof-mounted, freeing up room for a more spacious interior.

The Coradia Duplex train is a double-decker EMU operated in two to seven-carriage sets; furthermore, up to four train sets may be coupled together for a maximum length of 12 carriages. The Duplex range includes two models, one developed and used for TER services in France (designated Class Z 26500) as well as by Chemins de Fer Luxembourgeois (designated CFL 2200), while the other is used in Sweden.

The Coradia Nordic is a wider body train, specifically developed for the large gauge standard commonly used in Northern Europe, and is available in configurations of four, five or six-carriage EMUs. To create space for passenger amenities and seating, its traction equipment is mounted on the roof.

The Coradia LINT, originally designed by Linke-Hofmann-Busch before its acquisition by Alstom, is a diesel-powered light train, somewhat similar to the Siemens Desiro and Bombardier Talent. It is available in configurations of one, two, and three-carriage sets; up to three such trainsets can be attached together. The propulsion system of the LINT features a diesel powerpack mounted to the underframe of the carriage to maximise space in the low-floor section. The design reportedly complies with the latest European environmental standards. It is used by a number of railways in Germany (DB class 640 and 648), the Netherlands, and Denmark.

The Coradia Polyvalent is the latest variant in the Coradia family. The low integrated floor of the carriages provides improved accessibility and a high level of visibility to passengers. To restrict vibrations and noise levels, motorised bogies are placed at both ends of each carriage.

Operators

Europe

Denmark
Alstom Coradia LINT diesel unit are used in local trains.

Delivery was originally planned to start in 2024, but was delayed to mid-2025 due to design changes and "the general insecurity with supplies worldwide" in May 2022.

Finland
The VR Class Sm4 is used for regional traffic from Helsinki to Tampere and Kouvola.

France
During October 2009, Alstom received an €800 million ($1.2 billion) order for 100 Coradia Polyvalents from French national railway operator SNCF; a €130 million option for 19 more trains was exercised in January 2010. During March 2010, the company was awarded a follow-on €135 million contract for an additional 23 Coradia Polyvalents from SNCF. In May 2014, the Régiolis train was introduced by the ARF (Association of French Regions), SNCF and Alstom at the Vaugirard station in Paris. As many as 182 Régiolis trains have been ordered by 12 French Regions. SNCF ordered 14 hydrogen trains in 2021.

Germany
The Coradia Continental is in operation with several operators in Germany. It was introduced in 2002, and has been ordered by Hamburger Hochbahn (for agilis), DB Regio, Metronom and Hessische Landesbahn (HLB). In December 2020 S-Bahn Nuremberg switched their lines S1 and the new S5 (previously the Allersberg Express) over to the Coradia Continental. On S5 the trains had to be equipped with ETCS due to using the Nuremberg Ingolstadt high speed line.

The Coradia LINT is also operated, known by the local designations of DB class 640 and DB class 648. During May 2013, private operator AKN Eisenbahn ordered 14 Coradia Lints worth approximately €60 million. In May 2014, Alstom delivered the first of 24 modernised Lints to Germany’s Lower Saxony State public transit authority Landesnahverkehrsgesellschaft Niedersachsen (LNVG). In April 2014, the company agreed to supply six new Coradia Lints to LNVG; that same month, a €150 million contract for 29 Coradia Continental electrical trains was signed by Verkehrsverbund Mittelsachsen (VMS) in Central Saxony, Germany.

During December 2015, Hessische Landesbahn placed a €160m contract for 30 Coradia Continental EMUs, these are intended to be run on the Südhessen-Untermain network. In March 2016, Transdev placed an order for 28 Coradia Lints for operation in Augsburg, Germany. DB Regio placed a €40 million order for eight Lints in April 2016.

Italy
In September 2012, Alstom received a €67 million order from Ferrovie Nord Milano (FNM) for ten additional Coradia Meridian regional trains. Alstom had delivered 14 trains to FNM under the agreement by 2013. Ferrovie dello Stato ordered a further 70 Coradia Meridians from Alstom in November 2012. The Coradia has been used by Trenord for RegioExpress (RE) and for  

Malpensa Express service with the airport configuration Convoglio Servizio Aeroportuale (CSA).

Norway
January 2022 Norske tog signed an agreement to buy 30 new Coradia Nordic trains from Alstom, with the option to buy additional 170 trains.  Production of the new trains will start in 2023. The first trains are due in Norway for testing in 2024, and the trains will be delivered and put into operation in 2025.

Romania
In March 2022, the Romanian Railway Reform Authority or ARF (Autoritatea pentru Reforma Feroviara) for short, signed an order for 20 Coradia Stream trains with 15 years of maintenance, which will be leased to CFR Calatori and Romanian private operators. The order has an option for an additional 17 trains, with an additional 15 years of maintenance, bringing the total to 37 trains with 30 years of maintenance. This option was activated in September 2022 when an additional contract was signed. The Coradia Stream model ordered is 160 meters long, has a passenger capacity of 352, and can only run on Romania's 25kV ~ 50Hz AC network. These are equipped with PZB90 and ETCS Level 2.

Sweden

The Coradia Nordic is used for Storstockholms Lokaltrafik (designated X60) for commuter services in and around the Stockholm area. In June 2012, Storstockholms Lokaltrafik placed a €440 million ($548 million) order for 46 Coradia Nordic trains; this reportedly brought the total orders of Nordic trains to 129. Several more contracts have been signed for other Swedish operators, principally Skånetrafiken in Skåne County. In February 2015, Skånetrafiken placed an order worth approximately €150 million for 25 Coradia Nordics. Both the Continental and Nordic varieties were originally marketed as Coradia Lirex.

A version of the Coradia Duplex, the SJ X40, used by SJ AB, was originally supposed to be used for regional traffic around Mälaren in Sweden. However, SJ AB has also deployed the train on an intercity route between Stockholm and Gothenburg.

United Kingdom

Coradia 1000

The first British units entered service in 2001. The family is represented by two sub-families.

Coradia Juniper

The electric Coradia Juniper family consists of the Class 334 (used for Glasgow commuter services, 40 units), the Class 458 (used on routes from London Waterloo to Reading, 30 units), and formerly included the Class 460 (originally used for Gatwick Express airport services), which were incorporated into the 458 fleet by early 2016.

North America

Canada 

In 2015, the Coradia LINT was introduced in North American service by OC Transpo in Ottawa with six units for the O-Train Trillium line.

United States 
Metra is purchasing 200 bilevel Coradia passenger cars and has an option to purchase 300 more, while Virginia Railway Express—who partnered with Metra on the procurement—is purchasing 21 bilevel Coradia trailer cars with an option for another 44 trailers and 4 cab control cars.

Africa

Algeria 
In 2018, Coradia trains were introduced in Algeria. The SNTF acquired 17 trains for their long trips between Algiers-Oran starting from March 2018 and Algiers-Batna starting from May 2018. The company is also planning to use Coradia trains between Algiers-Setif. SNTF named the project "Coradia ELDJAZAÏR".

Senegal
Alstom began deliveries of fifteen four-car Coradia Polyvalent trainsets for the Train Express Regional between Dakar and the Blaise Diagne International Airport in Senegal in late 2018.

Accidents and incidents
 On 12 July 2016, an Alstom Coradia was involved in a head-on collision at Andria, Apulia, Italy. At least 20 people were killed.
 16 October 2020, a Dutch ICNG unit was being towed from Poland on delivery to the Netherlands when the train derailed at Dreileben, Germany. The driver of the locomotive hauling the train was injured.

Gallery

References

Sources

Coradia UK

External links
Coradia Stream regional trains - Alstom.com

 
British Rail diesel multiple units
Multiple units of Germany
Multiple units of Denmark
Multiple units of Sweden
Train-related introductions in 1998
Multiple units of Canada
Rolling stock of Senegal